Gabriele “Gabbi” Cunningham (born February 22, 1998) is an American Olympic track athlete. She won the bronze medal in the 60 metres hurdles at the 2022 World Indoor Championships in Belgrade.

An alumna of the North Carolina State University and from Charlotte, North Carolina, she attended Mallard Creek High School. Cunningham was a 2018 NCAA All-American for the Indoor 60m hurdles, and a 2019 NCAA All-American for the Indoor 60m and the 60m hurdles. She was a two time Pan Am Junior Championships Medalist in 2017, with gold in the 4x100m relay and bronze in the 200m.

In  Albuquerque on February 15, 2020, Cunningham ran 7.92 for the indoor 60m hurdles which placed her in the top 10 for the year in that discipline worldwide.

Cunningham finished fourth in the 100m hurdles at the 2020 United States Olympic Trials (track and field) in a personal best time of 12:53, and replaced Brianna McNeal in the US Olympic squad for the 2020 Summer Games. Cunningham ran 13.01s to place seventh in the event's final on 2 August.

In 2022, she earned the bronze medal for the 60m hurdles at the World Indoor Championships held in Belgrade with a time of 7.87 seconds. Cyréna Samba-Mayela won gold and Devynne Charlton captured silver.

International competitions

Personal bests
 60 metres indoor – 7.23 (Lubbock, TX 2019)
 60 metres hurdles indoor – 7.82 (Spokane, WA 2022)
 100 metres – 11.21 (+1.8 m/s, Des Moines, IA 2018)
 100 metres hurdles – 12.53 (+0.8 m/s, Eugene, OR 2021)
 200 metres – 23.04 (+0.4 m/s, Coral Gables, FL 2018)

References

External links
 
 
 
 
 

1998 births
Living people
American female hurdlers
North Carolina State University alumni
Sportspeople from Charlotte, North Carolina
Track and field athletes from North Carolina
African-American track and field athletes
Athletes (track and field) at the 2020 Summer Olympics
Olympic track and field athletes of the United States
21st-century African-American sportspeople
21st-century African-American women
World Athletics Indoor Championships medalists